Scorpaenopsis insperatus, the Sydney scorpionfish, is a species of venomous marine ray-finned fish belonging to the family Scorpaenidae, the scorpionfishes. This species is found in the Southwestern Pacific.

Size

References

insperatus
Taxa named by Hiroyuki Motomura
Fish described in 2004